Sousanis is a surname. Notable people with the surname include:

John Sousanis, American publisher, entertainment writer, theater critic, and columnist
Nick Sousanis, American scholar, art critic, and cartoonist